Croydon was an electoral district of the Legislative Assembly in the Australian state of Queensland from 1893 to 1912.

Based in the remote western part of the state, it was first created for the 1893 colonial election out of the district of Burke when that ceased to be a two-member electorate. The district was abolished for the 1912 state election and divided between the districts of Burke  and Flinders.

Members for Croydon

See also
 Electoral districts of Queensland
 Members of the Queensland Legislative Assembly by year
 :Category:Members of the Queensland Legislative Assembly by name

References

 

Former electoral districts of Queensland
Constituencies established in 1893
Constituencies disestablished in 1912
1893 establishments in Australia
1912 establishments in Australia